1st OTO Awards

Andrej Bagar Theatre, Nitra, Slovakia

Overall winner  Jarmila Hargašová

Hall of Fame  Jozef Kroner

2nd ►

The 1st OTO Awards, honoring the best in Slovak popular culture for the year 2000, took time and place on February 3, 2001 at the Andrej Bagar Theatre in Nitra. The ceremony broadcast live by STV was hosted by Tibor Hlista.

Presenters

 Karel Fiala, actor
 Pavol Hammel, musician
 Blažena Kočtúchová, TV announcer
 Zora Kolínska, actress
 Eva Krížiková, actress
 Táňa Lucká, EuroTelevízia chief editor 
 Milan Materák, STV managing director
 Izabela Pažítková, TV announcer
 Karol Polák, TV sport commentator
 Nora Selecká, TV announcer
 Eva Štefániková, Allianz representative

Performers

 Close Harmony Friends, vocal group
 Pavol Habera, singer
 Pavol Hammel, Gladiator and Petr Rajchert
 Katarína Hasprová, singer
 Jana Kirschner, singer
 Richard Müller and B3
 Senzus, band

Winners and nominees

Main categories
 Television

 Music

Others

References

External links
 Archive > OTO 2000 – 1st edition  (Official website)
 OTO 2000 – 1st edition (Official website - old)

01
2000 in Slovak television
2000 in Slovak music
2000 television awards